Paul Orr is a former professional rugby league footballer who played in the 1970s and 1980s. He played at club level for Castleford (Heritage № 578), and York.

References

External links
Paul Orr Memory Box Search at archive.castigersheritage.com

Living people
Castleford Tigers players
English rugby league players
Place of birth missing (living people)
Year of birth missing (living people)
York Wasps players